Lonnie O'Neal Ingram (1947 – June 25, 2020) was an American microbiologist who focused on microbial biotechnology. He was a Distinguished Professor at University of Florida and an Elected Fellow of the American Academy of Microbiology and Society of Industrial Microbiology.

References

1947 births
2020 deaths
University of Florida faculty
American microbiologists